Kontókali is a suburb of Corfu (city), located 6.8 km north of the city centre, on the Gulf of Gouvia. It is named after Christophoros Kontokalis, a sea captain and shipowner who was awarded the estate by the Venetians after his successful participation in the Battle of Lepanto.

It lies on a headland separating the gulf from the natural harbour and marina at Gouvia. The eastern side of the headland, looking back towards Corfu Town, features a narrow sandy beach in front of a row of private villas. Resort spas, and sailing and diving centres can be found towards the tip of the peninsula. The western side of the headland merges into Gouvia and the marina.

Populated places in Corfu (regional unit)